Box (Mill Lane) Halt railway station served the town of Box in Wiltshire, England. The station was on the main Great Western Railway line from London to Bristol and opened in 1930.

References 

 

Box, Wiltshire
Disused railway stations in Wiltshire
Former Great Western Railway stations
Railway stations in Great Britain opened in 1930
Railway stations in Great Britain closed in 1965
Beeching closures in England